Embilipitiya is a town, governed by an urban council, in Ratnapura District, Sabaragamuwa Province, Sri Lanka.

Overview 

In the 1970s it was a small town with two or three small boutiques. Under the Udawalawe development project, Embilipitiya grew and currently it is one of towns in Sri Lanka with a modern infrastructure. Embilipitiya is becoming the central hub  and the commercial centre of Greater Hambantota development project. Embilipitiya is the nearest city to Sooriyawewa International Cricket Stadium and Mattala International Airport. The six-lane main access road to Mattala Airport comes from Embilipitiya.

Transportation

During the 1970s transportation to and from Embilipitiya was difficult. There were two or three buses from Embilipitiya to Ratnapura and there was no guarantee that they would be running daily. However, the transportation system developed significantly. There are buses from Embilipitiya to Ratnapura and Colombo every five minutes and the Embilipitiya bus station is one of the busiest in Southern and Sabaragamuwa region. With the construction of the Southern Expressway, the expressway will be accessible through the Barawakumbuka entrance via Embilipitiya.

Education
Before 1970, Embilipitiya was one of the areas where there were poor education facilities. However, Embilipitiya eventually got better schools. Bodhiraja International School is the only school in Sabaragamuwa  Sri Lanka It is a good English medium college. Newly established Embilipitiya Technical College brought new hopes to school leavers in the area. [ Due to the rapid development of the education network in the area, Embilipitiya produced highly skilled and educated people. Thousands of doctors, engineers, lawyers, post graduate scientists, university professors and also reputed sportsmen and sportswomen hail from Embilipitiya.

Schools within Embilipitiya Urban council area include Embilipitiya President's College, Embilipitiya Maha Vidyalaya, Sri Bodhiraja International College, Embilipitiya Junior Secondary School, Moraketiya Maha Vidyalaya, Halmillaketiya Maha Vidyalaya, and Modrawana Maha Vidyalaya.

Infrastructure
Embilipitya has branches of almost all private and public banks and also the town is served by number of supermarket chains.

Urban Council
Embilipitiya became an urban council in 2006 and it is the only urban council in Sri Lanka to be promoted from village council and it is one of the three urban councils (Kegalle, Balangoda and Embilipitiya) in Sabaragamuwa province.

Economy
The Economic Centre and the international leaders' training center are key institutions in Embilipitiya. The recently established Embilipitya modern town hall is a major achievement in the area. Public and private institutes aim to help people engaged in the small-scale food processing sector to develop relevant skills and technology, and to increase their access to information which will contribute towards helping them gain control of their livelihoods and communities.

See also 
 List of railway stations in Sri Lanka
 List of municipalities in Sri Lanka

References

External links

 1989 School Children's Incident
 Embilipitiya Sri Lanka

Populated places in Sabaragamuwa Province